The Miliana-Margueritte Tramway or Zaccar Mines Tramway was a  long steam and diesel powered  gauge railway from PLM's Miliana-Margueritte station to the iron ore mines on Mont Zaccar in Miliana, Algeria.

Historical background and foundation 
On 16 September 1874, the governor granted a 17-year general mining concession to Messrs. Dupin and Allemand. 

On 5 March 1888, the brothers Giraud, two bankers from Oran, received an extension of this concession until 1 July 1906.

On 22 March 1904, the public company Société des Mines du Zaccar was founded in Paris. The purpose of the company was the exploitation of mineral deposits and the construction and operation of all railways required for the transport of ores and metals for a period of 60 years.

Operation 

The operation started on 7 October 1904, with an initial production of an average of 300 tons of iron ore per day. The production in 1905 already 87 879 tonnes. The railway was accepted for public use on 18 September 1908 and publicly operated from 14 October 1909. The transport volume rose until 1912 to a maximum of 227,000 tons per year. In 1927, as a record even 293,870 t were reduced.

The steam locomotive Jeanne could pull six large, funnel-shaped iron wagons filled with ore. These cars had a movable floor and transported 5 to 10 tons each. The Societe Anonyme des Mines du Zaccar took 1912 one of the first eight-wheel Garratt locomotives in operation. On 4 August 1926, a decree was passed, according to which the concession and modification of the operating conditions of the tram from Miliana to Margueritte by the Prefect of Algiers of 24 December 1925 were approved.

The underground mine employed up to 2,000 workers, or about every fourth worker in the city of Miliana. The mine and its railway were decommissioned on 31 December 1975. The mines and their railway closed on 31 December 1975.

Locomotives

Literature and art 
Abdelkader Hadj-Hamou (born 1891 in Miliana, died 1953) described in 1925 a ride on the tram in his book Zhora, la femme du Mineur.. He was son of the judge of the city of Miliana, court interpreter, professor of Arabic and almost 20 years chairman of the Grand Mosque.

The Dutch painter Bart van der Leck has produced a large number of studies of the mines and their rail vehicles, which have been purchased, archived and exhibited by the German-Dutch art collector Helene Kröller-Müller.

External links 
 Les Mines du Zaccar (WayBackMachine, with several photos)

References 

Rail transport in Algeria
Mining railways
750 mm gauge railways
Mining in Algeria
Iron ore railways